Joseph Smit (18 July 1836 – 4 November 1929) was a Dutch zoological illustrator.

Background

Smit was born in Lisse. He received his first commission from Hermann Schlegel at the Leiden Museum to work on the lithographs for a book on the birds of the Dutch East Indies. In 1866 he was invited to Britain by Philip Sclater to do the lithography for Sclater's Exotic Ornithology; he prepared a hundred images for the book.

He also did the lithography for his friend Joseph Wolf's Zoological Sketches, as well as Daniel Giraud Elliot's monographs on the Phasianidae and Paradisaeidae. Beginning in the 1870s, he worked on the Catalogue of the Birds in the British Museum (1874–1898, edited by Richard Bowdler Sharpe), and later on Lord Lilford's Coloured Figures of the Birds of the British Islands.

Smit contributed illustrations to John Gould's books on birds of different parts of the world, along with leading Victorian era wildlife artists including Wolf, Edward Lear, William Hart, Henry Constantine Richter and J.G. Keulemans. He also provided many of the illustrations of dinosaurs and other fossil creatures for the popular book Extinct Monsters (1892) by Henry Neville Hutchinson.

He died in his home on Cobden Hill, Radlett, Hertfordshire, United Kingdom on 4 November 1929 at age 93.

Family
His son Pierre Jacques Smit (born October 1863 at Leiderdorp – 1960), who used the name Peter Smit, was also a zoological illustrator.

See also
List of wildlife artists

References

External links

Illustrations from Smit in The Ibis.

1836 births
1929 deaths
Dutch illustrators
People from Lisse
Dutch bird artists
19th-century Dutch painters
Dutch male painters
20th-century Dutch painters
People from Radlett
19th-century Dutch male artists
20th-century Dutch male artists